England v. Louisiana State Board of Medical Examiners, 375 U.S. 411 (1964), was a United States Supreme Court decision that refined the procedures for U.S. federal courts to abstain from deciding issues of state law, pursuant to the doctrine set forth in Railroad Commission v. Pullman Co., 312 U.S. 496 (1941).

Facts
The plaintiffs were chiropractors in the state of Louisiana. They sued in the United States District Court to prevent state officials from applying a licensing scheme to them, arguing both that they were not within the group to whom the statute applied, and that the statute infringed the Fourteenth Amendment to the United States Constitution. The District Court noted that a state court might find that the state law did not apply to the plaintiffs, and abstained from hearing the case pursuant to the Pullman abstention doctrine.

The plaintiffs noted that a case refining Pullman called Government and Civil Employees Organizing Committee, CIO v. Windsor, 353 U.S. 364 (1957) had held that the judgment of the state court was meaningless unless the state court was aware that constitutional questions had also been raised as to the validity of the statute. The plaintiffs therefore brought both claims in the Louisiana state court (as they believed Pullman and Windsor required). The state court found against them on both statutory and constitutional claims.

The plaintiffs then returned to the District Court seeking a new hearing on the constitutional question. The defendant then sought a dismissal on res judicata grounds, contending that the decision of the state court was binding as to the constitutional issue.

Issue
Can the federal court hear the case once the state has ruled on the merits of the constitutional issue?

Result
The Supreme Court, in an opinion by Justice Brennan, noted that the state court determination would indeed bind the federal court. The proper procedure, the Court determined, is to give notice that the federal issue is contended, but to expressly reserve the claim on the federal issue for the federal court. If such a reservation is made, the parties can return to the federal court, even if the state court makes a ruling on the issue.

However, the Court also noted that even if the parties did not expressly reserve the federal issues, they can still return to the federal court if it is apparent that the parties had avoided adjudication of the federal law issues.

Because the plaintiffs in this case believed that they were just following the law as required, they would not be barred from continuing in the federal court.

See also
 List of United States Supreme Court cases, volume 375

External links
 

United States Constitution Article Three case law
United States Supreme Court cases
United States abstention case law
1964 in United States case law
Chiropractic
Legal history of Louisiana
United States Supreme Court cases of the Warren Court